Taylor Middle School may refer to:

 Taylor Middle School, in the Millbrae School District, California
 Taylor Middle School, in the Taylor Community School Corporation, Indiana
 Taylor Middle School, formerly in the Taylor School District, Michigan
 Taylor Middle School, in Albuquerque Public Schools, New Mexico
 Taylor Middle School, in the Taylor Independent School District, Texas
 Buddy Taylor Middle School, in Flagler County, Florida
 W. C. Taylor Middle School, in Fauquier County, Virginia